Alice Henderson is an American author currently residing in San Francisco.

Selected works

Buffyverse
Novels relating to the fictional universe established by Buffy and Angel:

Night Terrors (2005)
Portal Through Time (2006)

Other works
Unspeakable Limericks
"Mansion of Ghoulish Delight," a story in Mystery Date (2008)
Voracious (2009)
"Mandible," a story in Werewolves and Other Shapeshifters (2010)
"Residue," a story in Body Horror (2012)
"The Wreck," a story in Creepy #6 (2013)
Fresh Meat – a Supernatural novel (2013)
Aquatic Bourne (2015)
Skyfire Saga, a trilogy including the novels Shattered Roads (2018), Shattered Lands (2018), and Shattered Skies (2019)
 A Solitude of Wolverines, the first book in the Alex Carter thriller series (2020)
 A Blizzard of Polar Bears, the second book in the Alex Carter thriller series (2021)
 A Ghost of Caribou, the third book in the Alex Carter thriller series (2022)

External links

21st-century American novelists
21st-century American women writers
American women novelists
Living people
Place of birth missing (living people)
Writers from San Francisco
Year of birth missing (living people)